Culver Creek is a stream in the U.S. state of Ohio.

Culver Creek was named for John Culver, a pioneer who settled near it in 1809.

See also
List of rivers of Ohio

References

Rivers of Delaware County, Ohio
Rivers of Knox County, Ohio
Rivers of Ohio